Micrixalus kottigeharensis (commonly known as Kottigehar dancing frog or Kottigehar torrent frog) is a species of frog in the family Micrixalidae. It is endemic to the Western Ghats in Karnataka, India. It is one of the "Top 100 Evolutionarily Distinct and Globally Endangered (EDGE) Amphibians". The specific name means "from Kottigehara".

Taxonomy
Until 2014, both Micrixalus narainensis and Micrixalus swamianus were considered separate species, but have since been classified as junior synonyms of M. kottigeharensis based on phylogenetic analyses.

Description

Habitat
The preferred habitat of Micrixalus kottigeharensis are fast-flowing streams in primary and secondary forests. It is threatened by habitat loss.

References

Kottigeharensis
Frogs of India
Endemic fauna of the Western Ghats
EDGE species
Taxa named by C. R. Narayan Rao
Amphibians described in 1937
Taxonomy articles created by Polbot